The Gibson County Training School is a historic educational facility in Milan, Tennessee, that was built in 1926 with financial support from the Rosenwald Fund. It was listed on the National Register of Historic Places in 2012.

References

Buildings and structures in Gibson County, Tennessee
School buildings on the National Register of Historic Places in Tennessee
Rosenwald schools in Tennessee
National Register of Historic Places in Gibson County, Tennessee